The Firstborn Is Dead is the second studio album released by the post-punk band Nick Cave and the Bad Seeds. It was first released in 1985. On this record, singer Nick Cave continued his fascination with the American South, with its references to Elvis Presley and bluesmen like Blind Lemon Jefferson. The photography is by Jutta Heinglein.

The album was recorded in the Hansa Studios in Berlin, Germany. Cave later said of this album, "Berlin gave us the freedom and encouragement to do whatever we wanted. We'd lived in London for three years and it seemed that if you stuck your head out of the box, people were pretty quick to knock it back in. Particularly if you were Australian. When we came to Berlin it was the opposite. People saw us as some kind of force rather than a kind of whacky novelty act."

The album's name is a reference to Jesse Garon Presley, the stillborn identical twin of Elvis Presley.

The album was remastered and reissued on 27 April 2009 as a collector's edition CD/DVD set. The CD features the original 7-song vinyl LP's track listing, while "The Six Strings That Drew Blood" is featured as a bonus audio track on the accompanying DVD.

Track listing
All lyrics written by Nick Cave; all music written by the following.

"Tupelo" (Adamson, Harvey) - 7:17
"Say Goodbye to the Little Girl Tree" (Harvey) - 5:10
"Train Long-Suffering" (Cave) - 3:49
"Black Crow King" (Bargeld, Cave) - 5:05
"Knockin' on Joe" (Cave) - 7:38
"Wanted Man" (Bob Dylan) - 5:27
"Blind Lemon Jefferson" (Adamson, Bargeld, Harvey, Cave) - 6:10

Songs
"Tupelo" is loosely based on the John Lee Hooker song of the same title, which is about a flood in Tupelo, Mississippi (Hooker's song appears on Original Seeds). Tupelo is the birthplace of Elvis Presley. Cave's song incorporates imagery of the birth of Elvis and the apocalypse at the second coming of Christ. However, the "Looky, Looky Yonder" motif that features in the song is derived from a song of the same name recorded by Lead Belly, usually found as part of a medley which Cave himself covered under the title "Black Betty" on his third album, Kicking Against the Pricks.
"Wanted Man" evolved from a song composed by Bob Dylan and Johnny Cash. Cave was granted permission to alter the lyrics. Cave's lyrics include references to his friends, such as  photographer Polly Borland.
"The Six Strings that Drew Blood" is included on the 1988 CD reissue of the album, but not on the original LP. It was the B-side of the "Tupelo" single and is a remake of a song Cave originally recorded with the Birthday Party during the Mutiny sessions in 1982.

Singles
 "Tupelo" (MUTE 038) (29 July 1985)
 "Tupelo" (Single Version) b/w: "The Six Strings That Drew Blood"

Personnel
Nick Cave and the Bad Seeds
 Nick Cave – lead vocals, harmonica
 Blixa Bargeld - guitar, backing vocals, slide guitar, piano
 Barry Adamson - bass, backing vocals, guitar, organ, drums
 Mick Harvey – drums, backing vocals, guitar, organ, piano, bass

Chart positions

References

1985 albums
Nick Cave albums
Mute Records albums
Albums produced by Flood (producer)